Denis Valerevich Grachev (born 18 January 1992) is a Russian badminton player. He educated in the School of Arts, Culture and Sports at the Far Eastern Federal University, and was a champion of the 2014 National University Championships in the men's singles and doubles events. Grachev was part of the Russian national team that won the bronze medal at the 2020 European Men's Team Championships.

Achievements

BWF International Challenge/Series (5 titles, 2 runners-up) 
Men's doubles

Mixed doubles

  BWF International Challenge tournament
  BWF International Series tournament
  BWF Future Series tournament

References

External links 
 

1992 births
Living people
Sportspeople from Vladivostok
Russian male badminton players
Far Eastern Federal University alumni